Elias "Bud" O'Keeffe (born 1886) was an Irish hurler and Gaelic footballer who played for the Tipperary senior teams.

O'Keeffe made his first appearance for the Tipperary hurling team during the 1907 championship and was a regular member of the starting fifteen until he left the panel after the 1915 championship. During that time he won one Munster medal. O'Keeffe was an All-Ireland runner-up on one occasion.  He also enjoyed one season as captain of the Tipperary football team.

At club level O'Keeffe played with Moyne–Templetuohy and was a one-time county football championship medallist with Castleiney.

References

1886 births
Year of death missing
Dual players
Moyne-Templetuohy hurlers
Loughmore-Castleiney Gaelic footballers
Tipperary inter-county hurlers
Tipperary inter-county Gaelic footballers